Bianca Monica Malasmas Gonzalez-Intal (born March 11, 1983) is a Filipina television host and model.

Hosting career
Gonzalez first hosted GameChannel Extreme with Iya Villania, Chase Tinio and Aaron Mempin. Her first ever on-cam career in ABS-CBN network however was for the now defunct show, Review Night which she hosted with Ryan Agoncillo in Cinema One. For a little less than a year, she got her Studio 23 stint as a tadjock for Wazzup Wazzup. She also co-hosted MTV U-Break.

In 2001, she hosted Studio 23's Gameplan then transferred to Cinema One's Review Night with Ryan Agoncillo. She also became part of a Studio 23 morning show, Breakfast and later moved to the mother network to co-host Magandang Umaga, Pilipinas and StarDance, the director of which was Lino Cayetano.

Her career was boosted after an invitation to join Pinoy Big Brother: Celebrity Edition where she landed at 3rd place garnering 245,594 votes or 19% of the total votes and got major breaks afterwards. Aside from hosting Y Speak, she also landed a hosting job for Pinoy Big Brother Teen Edition UpLate and as the resident campus VJ for Pinoy Dream Academy's Update and UpLate shows.

She also hosted The Filipino Channel show TFC Connect, where she discusses Filipino issues abroad.

Currently, she continues to host and produce Y Speak. She also hosted the now defunct showbiz-oriented news show Blog: Barkada Log, and the showbiz show Entertainment Live, but ended on January 28, 2012, and together with her co-hosts in Pinoy Big Brother, Toni Gonzaga and Mariel Rodriguez. She reprised her role as one of the hosts of Pinoy Big Brother: Celebrity Edition 2 in a brand new "spin-off" show called Über. She hosts Cinema News Alert: Weekend Edition and a Cinema Jock features movie of the day on Cinema One.

On Tuesday nights, she takes us on a journey of discovering the "Ninoys" of the new generation, I Am Ninoy, founded on the popular campaign that is now developed for TV. The show started airing November 25, marking the would-have-been 76th birthday of Ninoy Aquino, and formerly aired on TV5.

Last December 14, 2011, Gonzalez signed a 2-year Contract with ABS-CBN. Present during Gonzalez' contract signing were ABS-CBN executives including president Charo Santos Concio. She is currently hosting a morning show, Umagang Kay Ganda and a reality show Pinoy Big Brother.

Advocacies and issues

On February 11, 2010, Bianca Gonzalez was appointed a UNICEF Philippines Child Rights Supporter. She has supported UNICEF in a personal capacity since 2007, including fundraising for education activities. In December 2007, she raised PHP 36,000 through her blog website for UNICEF's 100-book library program.

On December 10, 2013, her continuous support for Typhoon Haiyan survivors landed her the 6th spot in The Huffington Post 6 Celebrities Who Remind Us to Not Forget Typhoon Haiyan Survivors Too Soon alongside other international celebrities such as Victoria and David Beckham, Pau Gasol, Rihanna, Vanessa Hudgens and Justin Bieber.

Personal life
Bianca Gonzalez is the cousin of actors, Dingdong Dantes, Arthur Solinap and Carlo Gonzales. She is sister of TV host JC Gonzalez. In March 2014, she was engaged to PBA player JC Intal, whom she married on December 4, 2014, in El Nido, Palawan. In April 2015, television host Boy Abunda announced on his program Aquino & Abunda Tonight that Gonzalez and her husband Intal were expecting their first child. The child, a daughter, Lucia Martine was born on October 23, 2015.

Filmography

Television

 Pinoy Big Brother (ABS-CBN, 2006–2022) as herself/host/Housemate

Film

Awards

References

External links
Bianca Gonzalez's blog

1983 births
Living people
Ateneo de Manila University alumni
Filipino television presenters
Filipino female models
Pinoy Big Brother contestants
People from Manila
Star Magic
UNICEF Goodwill Ambassadors
Filipino bloggers
21st-century Filipino women writers
Filipino women bloggers
ABS-CBN personalities
Filipino women television presenters